"Merry Christmas, Darling" is a Christmas song by the Carpenters (music by Richard Carpenter, lyrics by Frank Pooler), and originally recorded in 1970. It was first available on a 7-inch single that year (A&M Records 1236), and was later re-issued in 1974 (A&M 1648) and again in 1977 (A&M 1991). The single went to number one on Billboard's Christmas singles chart in 1970 (and did so again in 1971 and 1973) and peaked at number 41 in Cashbox.

In 1978, the Carpenters issued their Christmas Portrait album, which contained a new version of "Merry Christmas Darling". The original 1970 mix continued to be used for all single releases, however. The major difference between the 1970 and 1978 versions is a newly recorded vocal by Karen Carpenter on the latter, which was done at her request. Richard Carpenter himself calls the original recording one of his sister's very best. The original single version of the song can be found on the compilation albums From the Top and The Essential Collection: 1965–1997.  The song was covered by Lea Michele on "A Very Glee Christmas", the 10th episode of the second season of Glee. It is featured on the Glee: The Music, The Christmas Album.

In 2018, a version of "Merry Christmas Darling" featuring Karen Carpenter's vocals with new instrumentation appeared on the album The Carpenters With The Royal Philharmonic Orchestra, produced by Richard Carpenter.

History

The lyrics were written in 1946 by an 20-year-old Frank Pooler, which, according to him, were about a love interest he had at the time. 20 years later in 1966, when he was choral director at California State University, Long Beach, two of his aspiring music students, Karen and Richard Carpenter, who were beginning to have success as a local band, asked him (their favorite professor) if he had any ideas for holiday songs. According to Pooler, they had become tired of the standard holiday songs they were singing. Pooler gave them the lyrics of the song he had written from years before, and told them he did not think much of the original melody. According to Pooler, Richard wrote a new tune for the lyricsthe tune currently usedin 15 minutes. Four years later, in 1970, the Carpenters first recorded and released it as a single.

Personnel
Karen Carpenter - lead and backing vocals
Richard Carpenter - backing vocals, piano, celesta, Wurlitzer electric piano, orchestration
Joe Osborn - bass
Hal Blaine - drums
Bob Messenger - tenor saxophone
Uncredited - vibes

Other versions
Elvis Presley almost recorded his own version in the early 1970s, but struggled learning the bridge, as he could not read music, and gave up.

In 1999, Amy Grant recorded a version for her third Christmas album, A Christmas to Remember. It was a hidden track, uncredited on the artwork and available only on copies purchased at Target.

In 2020, for the 50th anniversary of the song, Canadian singer Lennon Stella covered "Merry Christmas Darling" for Amazon Music's Originals playlist.

In December 2020, musical theater star Liz Callaway recorded a cover of "Merry Christmas Darling" for her album Comfort and Joy (An Acoustic Christmas).

Charts

Other charting versions

Glee Cast version

References

External links

1970 songs
1970 singles
A&M Records singles
The Carpenters songs
American Christmas songs
Kimberley Locke songs
Vanessa Williams songs
Songs written by Richard Carpenter (musician)